James Patrick Scanlon (born September 23, 1952 in Minneapolis, Minnesota), also known as Pat Scanlon, is a former Major League Baseball third baseman. He played all or part of four seasons in the majors, from  until , for the Montreal Expos and San Diego Padres.

Career
Scanlon was originally drafted by the Expos in 1970 after excelling as a three sport athlete at Benilde High School in St. Louis Park, Minnesota. He was dealt along with Tony Scott and Steve Dunning from the Expos to the St. Louis Cardinals for Bill Greif, Sam Mejías and Ángel Torres on November 8, 1976. All three players coming to St. Louis had spent the 1976 season with the Denver Bears which were led by recently-hired Cardinals manager Vern Rapp. Scanlon batted .308 with 18 home runs and 75 runs batted in (RBI) during that campaign.

After starting the 1977 season in the minor leagues, Scanlon was traded for a second time within a seven-month span, along with John D'Acquisto from the Cardinals to the San Diego Padres for Butch Metzger on May 17, 1977. He returned to the Expos organization in 1978-79, then finished his playing career in the Chicago White Sox farm system in the 1980s.

In 2013, Scanlon was inducted into the first ever class of the Benilde-St. Margaret's Athletic Hall of Fame.

Personal life 
Scanlon is currently an Agent for Farmer's Insurance in Eden Prairie, Minnesota. He currently resides in Richfield, Minnesota with his wife Carole. Scanlon and his wife have five children, Jessica, James, Patrick, Sallie, and Joe. He and his youngest son, Joe, are currently business partners operating sports & recreation company, Gear Up Sports. Gear Up Sports specializes in physical education equipment and school athletic gear.

References

External links

1952 births
Living people
American expatriate baseball players in Canada
Baseball players from Minnesota
Denver Bears players
Gulf Coast Expos players
Hawaii Islanders players
Iowa Oaks players
Major League Baseball third basemen
Memphis Blues players
Montreal Expos players
New Orleans Pelicans (baseball) players
Québec Carnavals players
San Diego Padres players
Watertown Expos players
West Palm Beach Expos players